Raymond Garfield Gettell (March 4, 1881 – October 9, 1949) was an American football coach and political science professor. He served as the head football coach at Trinity College in Hartford, Connecticut from 1908-1913 and at Amherst College from 1917-1920, compiling a career college football coaching record of 51–20–6; he also served as professor of political science from 1914-1923. His wife, Nelene Groff Gettell (née Knapp), taught at Amherst High School from 1921-1923; the 1923 Yearbook was dedicated to her. The Gettells moved to Berkeley, California in 1923 so that Gettell could assume the head of the political science department at the University of California, which he held until his death.

Raymond and Nelene Gettell were the parents of economist and college administrator Richard Glenn Gettell.

Head coaching record

References

1881 births
1949 deaths
Amherst College faculty
Amherst Mammoths football coaches
Trinity Bantams football coaches
University of California, Berkeley College of Letters and Science faculty
Ursinus College alumni
People from Shippensburg, Pennsylvania
Sportspeople from Pennsylvania